The Personal Emergency Link (PE Link) was established by Senior Citizen Home Safe Association to launch a 24-hour personal emergency link to help the needy in Hong Kong.

Background
During an unexpected cold spell in 1996, more than a hundred unattended elderly who lived alone died. In response, the Association were dedicated to render emergency relief and total care service to all elderly and chronic invalids by setting up the PE Link.

Health in Hong Kong
Public health and safety in Hong Kong